Shahzad Kashmiri is a Pakistani television and film director and cinematographer. Kashmiri is best known for his work as a cinematographer in Hum TV drama serials such as Humsafar, Bilqees Kaur, Mata-e-Jaan Hai Tu, Zard Mausam, Yaqeen Ka Safar, Maat and Parizaad. Kashmiri was awarded Hum Honorary Phenomenal Serial Award for his work on Humsafar.

In 2012, Kashmiri debut as a television director and directed critically acclaimed drama series including Dil-e-Muztar (2013), Alvida (2015) and Maana Ka Gharana (2015-2016) and went onto receive Best Director Drama Serial nomination at 2nd Hum Awards for Dil-e-Muztar.

In 2015, Kashmiri co-directed Bin Roye as his feature film debut. The film became the third highest-grossing film of Pakistan. Kashmiri received Best Film Director nomination at 15th Lux Style Awards.

Filmography

Director

Film
 Bin Roye (2015)

Television
 Parizaad (2021)
 Be Adab (2020) 
 Sabaat (2020)
 Anaa(2019) 
 Yaqeen Ka Safar (2017) 
 Bin Roye (2016)
 Saya-e-Dewar Bhi Nahi (2016)
 Maana Ka Gharana (2015-2016)
 Alvida (2015)
 Mere Humdum Mere Dost (2014)
 Dil-e-Muztar (2013)

Cinematography
 Humsafar
 Mata-e-Jaan Hai Tu 
 Zard Mausam
 Maat 
 Bilqees Kaur 
 Meray Dard Ko Jo Zuban Miley
 Nikhar Gaye Gulab Sare
 Mar Jain Bhi To Kya
 Zindagi Gulzar Hai

Awards and nominations
 2014 - 2nd Hum Awards: Best Director Drama Serial - nom

Lux Style Awards

References

External links
  
 

Living people
People from Sialkot
Hum Award winners
Pakistani film directors
Pakistani television directors
Pakistani cinematographers
Pakistani people of Kashmiri descent
Year of birth missing (living people)